Pseudmelisa chalybsa is a moth in the family Erebidae. It was described by George Hampson in 1910. It is found in the Democratic Republic of the Congo.

References

Moths described in 1910
Syntomini
Endemic fauna of the Democratic Republic of the Congo